Ferres or Ferrés may refer to:

People 
 Brett Ferres (born 1986), British rugby league player
 Enrique Avellán Ferrés (1904–1984), Ecuadorian writer
 James Moir Ferres (1813–1870), Canadian journalist and politician
 Naomi Ferres (born 1997), Australian footballer
 Oriol Santos Ferrés (born 1986), Spanish footballer
 Veronica Ferres (born 1965), German producer and actress

Places 
 Ferres, district of Piesport, Rhineland-Palatinate, Germany
 Les Ferres, commune in Alpes-Maritimes, France